A business jet, private jet, or bizjet is a jet aircraft designed for transporting small groups of people. Business jets may be adapted for other roles, such as the evacuation of casualties or express parcel deliveries, and some are used by public bodies, government officials, VIPs, or the armed forces.

History

Early developments
The first small jet-powered civil aircraft was the Morane-Saulnier MS.760 Paris, developed privately in the early 1950s from the MS.755 Fleuret two-seat jet trainer. First flown in 1954, the MS.760 Paris differs from subsequent business jets in having only four seats arranged in two rows without a center aisle, similar to a light aircraft, under a large sliding canopy similar to that of a fighter. A U.S. type certificate was awarded in July 1958, but commercial sales were limited, with most examples going to the military; an improved civil version similar to a modern very light jet, with a 6-seat enclosed cabin and a conventional door, never proceeded past the prototype stage. The commercial failure of the MS.760 Paris prompted the cancellation of projects by Cessna and Douglas Aircraft to market similar jets.

The development of center-aisle cabin business jets was accelerated by an August 1956 United States Air Force (USAF) letter of the requirement for two "off-the-shelf" aircraft: the larger UCX (cargo) and smaller UTX (trainer). These requirements differed from standard Air Force procurement contracts in that there would be no formal competitions, and manufacturers were expected to develop the aircraft without government funds; despite this, a substantial USAF purchase would offset the large investment necessary to develop prototypes. The Lockheed Corporation and McDonnell Aircraft both began the development of UCX aircraft, while North American Aviation pursued the UTX requirement.

1950s first flight 
The aircraft seated a single pilot and up to three passengers under a sliding canopy and was first flown on 29 July 1954. 219 were built.

The Lockheed JetStar, designed to meet USAF UCX requirements and seating ten passengers and two crew, first flew on 4 September 1957. A total of 204 aircraft were produced from 1957 to 1978 powered by several different engines; four  Pratt & Whitney JT12 turbojets, then Garrett TFE731 turbofans for a  MTOW, then two General Electric CF700 turbofans.

The smaller,  MTOW North American Sabreliner, tailored to the USAF UTX requirement, first flew on 16 September 1958. Powered by two Pratt & Whitney JT12 turbojet engines then Garrett TFE731s, more than 800 were produced from 1959 to 1982.

Designed in 1957 for the UCX requirement, the McDonnell 119 was delayed by the cancellation of the Fairchild J83 engine program, and first flew on 11 February 1959 powered by four Westinghouse J34 turbojets. The 119 was certified for a  MTOW with four Pratt & Whitney JT12 or General Electric CF700 engines, but no firm orders were received, and only the single prototype was completed.

1960s first flight 

The  MTOW British Aerospace 125 first flew on 13 August 1962 as the de Havilland DH.125, powered by two   Armstrong Siddeley Viper turbojets. Its engines were replaced by Garrett TFE731s, then Pratt & Whitney Canada PW300 turbofans. Almost 1,700 aircraft of all variants, including the Hawker 800, were produced between 1962 and 2013.

The Aero Commander 1121 Jet Commander, which later became the IAI Westwind, first flew on 27 January 1963, powered by two General Electric CJ610 turbojets, then Garrett TFE731s. Production of Jet Commanders and Westwinds from 1965 to 1987 came to 442 aircraft; and it was developed as the IAI Astra, later re-branded as the Gulfstream G100.

The  MTOW Dassault Falcon 20 first flew on 4 May 1963, powered by two General Electric CF700s, then Garrett ATF3 turbofans and Garrett TFE731s. A total of 508 were built from 1963 to 1988, and it is the basis of the Dassault Falcon family.

The first light jet first flew on 7 October 1963 : the Learjet 23. Powered by two  General Electric CJ610s, its  MTOW complies with FAR Part 23 regulations. The first member of the Learjet family, 104 were built between 1962 and 1966.

The forward wing sweep,  MTOW Hamburger Flugzeugbau HFB 320 Hansa Jet first flew on 21 April 1964, powered by two General Electric CJ610s; 47 were built between 1965 and 1973.
The joint Piaggo-Douglas,  MTOW Piaggio PD.808 first flew on 29 August 1964, powered by two Armstrong Siddeley Vipers, 24 were built for the Italian Air Force.

On 2 October 1966 the first large business jet first flew, the  MTOW Grumman Gulfstream II, powered by two  Rolls-Royce Spey turbofans. From 1967 to the late 70s, 258 were built and it led to the ongoing Gulfstream Aerospace long range family.

The  MTOW Cessna Citation I first flew on 15 September 1969, powered by two  Pratt & Whitney Canada JT15D turbofans. Produced between 1969 and 1985 for a total of 689 examples, it is the first of the Cessna Citation family.

1970s first flight 

The trijet Dassault Falcon 50 made its first flight on 7 November 1976. The  MTOW airplane is powered by three  TFE731 engines. With the cross-section of the Falcon 20, it is the basis of the larger Falcon 900.

On 8 November 1978, the prototype Canadair Challenger took off. The  MTOW craft, usually powered by two  General Electric CF34s, formed the basis of the long range Bombardier Global Express family and of the Bombardier CRJ regional airliners. The 1000th Challenger entered service in 2015.

On 30 May 1979 the all-new  MTOW Cessna Citation III took off for the first time, powered by two  TFE731s.

The Mitsubishi MU-300 Diamond made its first flight on 29 August 1978. The  MTOW jet was powered by two  JT15D. The design was later sold and was renamed Beechjet 400 then Hawker 400, with a total of 950 produced of all variants.

1980s first flight 

The 1980s only saw the introduction of derivatives and no major new designs. Also there was an advent of fractional ownership in the late 1980s for business jets. For much of the 1980s, sales of new aircraft slumped.

1990s first flight 

On 29 April 1991, the Cessna CitationJet was first flown. Powered by two  Williams FJ44 engines, the  light jet used a modified Citation II fuselage with a new wing and tail, and was subsequently developed into the CJ series and M2, ultimately replacing the Citation I, Citation II and Citation V series. The 2,000th CitationJet was delivered in 2017.

The first flight of the all-new Learjet 45 was on 7 October 1995. All of the 642 aircraft built since then have been powered by two  TFE731 engines.

Powered by two  Williams FJ44s, the  Beechcraft Premier I light jet made its first flight on 22 December 1998. Nearly 300 had been made before production stopped in 2013.

2000s first flight 

In the opposite way compared to Bombardier, which developed airliners from a business jet, Embraer derived the Legacy 600 from the Embraer ERJ family of regional jet airliners. Powered by two  Rolls-Royce AE 3007s, the first flight of the  aircraft was on 31 March 2001.

On 14 August 2001, the Bombardier Challenger 300 made its first flight. The  aircraft is powered by two  HTF7000s. The 500th example was delivered in 2015.

The first very light jet, the  MTOW Eclipse 500, took off for the first time on 26 August 2002, powered by two  Pratt & Whitney Canada PW600s. Between then and the end of production in 2008, 260 were produced.

Another new small jet, the  Honda HA-420 HondaJet, first flew on 3 December 2003 powered by two  GE Honda HF120 engines mounted above the wing in a configuration unique amongst business jets. As of March 2020, 150 had been delivered.

It was followed by the  MTOW Cessna Citation Mustang on 23 April 2005, powered by two  Pratt & Whitney Canada PW600s and with more than 450 produced.

Then the Embraer Phenom 100 made its maiden flight on 26 July 2007. The  MTOW airplane is powered by two  Pratt & Whitney Canada PW600s. With its Phenom 300 development, nearly 600 have been built.

2010s first flight 

The first flight of the midsize, fly-by-wire,  Honeywell HTF7000-powered Embraer Legacy 500 was on 27 November 2012. It was followed by the shorter Legacy 450 on 28 December 2013.

New models 

After peaking in 2008, deliveries slowed due to political instability but the industry hopes to revive demand by introducing more attractive and competitive new models, four in 2018:
 the  range Bombardier Global 7500 large-cabin jet, before the  Global 8000 in 2019;
 the  large-cabin Gulfstream G500, replacing the Gulfstream G450, then the longer,  G600 eventually superseding the G550;
 the  Cessna Citation Longitude super midsize jet;
 the superlight Pilatus PC-24.

In October 2018, consultant Jetcraft expected 20 variants or new designs to enter service before 2023 (seven large, seven midsize and six small):
in 2019 the Global 5500/6500, Gulfstream G600, Citation XLS++ and a CitationJet CJ4+/, while the Embraer Praetor 500/600 to be introduced in 2019 were predicted for 2021/2022;
in 2020 a Gulfstream G750;
in 2021 the Dassault Falcon 6X, Learjet 70XR/75XR and Global 7500XR;
in 2022 the Bombardier Challenger 350XRS;
in 2023 the Citation Hemisphere, an Embraer Legacy 700, Phenom 100V+, Dassault Falcon 9X, Bombardier Challenger 750 and Gulfstream G400NG;
in 2025 a Citation Mustang 2+.

Configuration 

Most production business jets use two jet engines as a compromise between the operating economy of fewer engines and the ability to safely continue flight after an engine failure. Exceptions include the early Lockheed Jetstar with four engines; the Dassault Falcon 50 and derivatives with three; and the Cirrus Vision SF50 with one, a configuration also used in several similar very light jet design concepts. Most business jets use podded engines mounted on the rear fuselage with a cruciform tail or T-tail to reduce interference drag and increase exhaust clearance. Practical limits on the ground clearance of these smaller aircraft have prompted designers to avoid the common jetliner configuration of a low wing with underslung podded engines. The sole business jet to use this layout, the early McDonnell 119, was rejected by the USAF due to foreign object damage concerns, leading to the failure of the program. The recent HondaJet uses wing-mounted engines but mitigates this problem with its unique over-the-wing engine pods.

As with jetliners, swept wings are often used to increase cruise speed, but straight wings are also commonplace; notably, Cessna deliberately prioritized docile low-speed handling in choosing straight wings for many models in its popular Citation family, envisioning that owners transitioning from slower piston engined or turboprop aircraft would want to maintain the ability to use relatively short runways, and that lower approach speeds would ease single-pilot operations, particularly by relatively inexperienced owner-pilots.

Rolls-Royce plc powers over 3,000 business jets, 42% of the fleet: all the Gulfstreams and Bombardier Globals, the Cessna Citation X and Embraer Legacy 600, early Hawkers, and many small jets with the Williams-Rolls FJ44.

Market

Fleet

About 70% of the fleet was in North America at the end of 2011, the European market is the next largest, with growing activity in the Middle East, Asia, and Central America.

On 1 April 2017, there were 22,368 business jets in the worldwide fleet, of which 11.2% were for sale.

By October 2018, the entire private jet fleet was dominated by Textron (Beechcraft, Cessna and Hawker branded aircraft) with 43.9%, then Bombardier with 22.4%, Gulfstream with 13.0%, Dassault with 9.6% and Embraer with 5.8%, mostly in North America (64.6%), followed by Europe (13.0%) South America (12.1%) and Asia-Pacific (5.9%).

As on March 31, 2019, there are 22,125 business jets in the worldwide fleet and top 20 country markets account for 89% of this total fleet.

Market shares

In 2015 the total airplane billing amounted to US$21.9 billion, and 718 business jets were delivered to customers across the globe: 199 (%) by Bombardier Aerospace, 166 (%) by Textron Aviation, 154 (%) by Gulfstream Aerospace, 120 (%) by Embraer and 55 (%) by Dassault Aviation.

In 2017, 676 business jets were shipped, led by Gulfstream with $6.56 billion for 120 aircraft, Bombardier with $5.2 billion for 140, Textron with $2.87 billion (including propeller aircraft and  jets), Dassault with $2.42 billion for 49 and Embraer with $1.35 billion for 109.

In 2022, 712 business jets were shipped, led by Gulfstream with $6.60 billion for 120 aircraft, Bombardier with $6,04 billion for 123, Textron Aviation with $3,62 billion, Dassault Aviation with $1,76 billion for 32, Embraer with $1,36 for 102 and Pilatus with $900 million for 123 aircraft.

Second hand

The residual value level for a five-year old aircraft is at 56% of the list price.
A new business aircraft typically depreciates by 50% in five years before depreciation flattens between years 10 and 15, and the owner of a 15-to-20 year old aircraft is often the last, matching luxury cars.

Business jets have varying value retention, between the leading Embraer Phenom 300E, sold for $9.45 million in 2018 and expected to retain 68% of its value 15 years later for $6.46 million in 2033, and the trailing $24.5 million Gulfstream G280, predicted to retain 42% of its value for $10.25 million.

Forecasts

In October 2017 Jetcraft forecast 8,349 unit deliveries in the next decade for $252 billion, a  $M average. Cessna should lead the numbers with 27.3% of the deliveries ahead of Bombardier with 20.9%, while Gulfstream would almost lead the revenue market share with 27.8% trailing Bombardier with 29.2%.
For 2016–2025, Jetcraft forecast Pratt & Whitney Canada should be the first engine supplier with 30% of the $24B revenue, in front of the current leader Rolls-Royce at 25%. Honeywell will hold 45% of the $16B in avionics revenue ahead of Rockwell Collins with 37% and Garmin.

For 2019–2028, Honeywell predicts 7,700 aircraft to be delivered for $251 billion. Its breakdown is 62% big (87% in value) – super-midsize to business liner, 10% midsize (7% in value) – light-medium to medium, and 28%   small (6% in value). The global demand is expected to come from North America for 61%, 16% from Europe, 12% from Latin America, 7% from Asia-Pacific and 4% from Middle East and Africa.

For the next decade, Aviation Week predicts 8,683 business jets and 2,877 turboprops deliveries, from 792 jets in 2019 to 917 in 2028, and mostly in North America with 5,986 jets and 2,024 turboprops worth $126.1 billion.
Most value will come from ultra-long-range jets with $104.7 billion, followed by super-midsize jets for $33.3 billion and large jets for $30.6 billion.
The fleet was predicted to grow from 31,300 aircraft to nearly 35,600 with Textron leading the market with 25% of deliveries worth $32.1 billion.
For the decade starting in 2018, 22,190 engine deliveries were forecast (including several turboprop engine models), led by the Honeywell HTF7000, Williams FJ44 and Pratt & Whitney Canada PW300. The average utilization was forecast to be 365 flight hours per aircraft per year.

Engines

Built by Pratt & Whitney Canada, variants of the  PW300 power the Dassault Falcon 7X and Dassault Falcon 8X trijets and Dassault Falcon 2000 twinjet.
The 10,000–20,000 lbf (45–89 kN) PW800 was launched in 2008 but was selected for the Cessna Citation Columbus, cancelled a year after. It was then chosen for the Gulfstream G500/G600 launched in 2014 and due to enter service in 2018/2019, and picked in 2018 for the Dassault Falcon 6X 2021 first flight.
The   Safran Silvercrest was rejected for the cancelled Falcon 5X, it is still selected for the Cessna Citation Hemisphere, but the aircraft development is suspended until the turbofan is perfected.
GE Aviation produces the  Passport for the Bombardier Global 7500, due to enter service in 2018, and is developing an engine for the supersonic Aerion AS2.

Rolls-Royce plc was revealed as the engine supplier for the Global 5500/6500 with the Rolls-Royce Pearl 15, an improved BR710 resembling the Gulfstream G650's BR725.
The AE3007C powered Cessna Citation X+ is near its production end.
The Honeywell HTF7700L replaced the Silvercrest for the Citation Longitude, due to enter service in 2018, and already powers the Bombardier Challenger 300/350, Gulfstream G280 and Embraer Legacy 450/500.
Its  TFE731 powers the Learjet 70/75 and Dassault Falcon 900LX.
Williams International’s FJ44 powers the Pilatus PC-24, launched in 2013 and introduced in early 2018, the Nextant 400XTi and the in-development SyberJet SJ30i, as well as the Cessna Citation CJ3+/4, while the smaller FJ33 powers the Cirrus Vision SF50 single-engine business jet.

Operators

There are three basic types of operators that own, manage and operate private jets.

Flight departments
Flight departments are corporate-owned operators that manage the aircraft of a specific company. Ford Motor Company, Chrysler, and Altria are examples of companies that own, maintain and operate their own fleet of private aircraft for their employees. Flight departments handle all aspects of aircraft operation and maintenance. In the United States, flight-department aircraft operate under FAR 91 operating rules.

A 2010 study by the United States National Business Aviation Association found that small and midsize companies that use private jets produce a 219% higher earnings growth rate than those that strictly use airlines.

Charter companies
Charter operators own or manage private jets for multiple clients. Like traditional flight departments, charter companies handle all aspects of aircraft operation and maintenance. However, they are not aligned with just one corporation. They manage aircraft for a private owner or corporation and also handle the sales of available flight time on the aircraft they own or manage. Maintenance services can also be provided.

In the United States, business aircraft may be operated under either FAR 91 as private operations for the business purposes of the owner, or under FAR 135 of the Federal Aviation Regulations as commercial operations for the business purposes of a third party. One common arrangement for operational flexibility purposes is for the aircraft's owner to operate the aircraft under FAR 91 when needed for its own purposes, and to allow a third-party charter-manager to operate it under FAR 135 when the aircraft is needed for the business purposes of third parties (such as for other entities within the corporate group of the aircraft's owner).

Aircraft charter brokers have entered the marketplace through the ease of setting up a website and business online. Aircraft charter operators are legally responsible for the safe operation of aircraft and charter brokers require no economic authority and are largely unregulated. The Department of Transportation requires that air charter brokers disclose to the consumer that they do not operate aircraft and cannot use terms like "our fleet of aircraft", "we operate", "our charter service" and others.

Fractional ownership 
Since 1996 the term "fractional jet" has been used in connection with business aircraft owned by a consortium of companies. Under such arrangements, overhead costs such as flight crew, hangarage and maintenance are split among the users.

Fractional ownership of aircraft involves an individual or corporation that pays an upfront equity share for the cost of an aircraft. If four parties are involved, a partner would pay one-fourth of the aircraft price (a "quarter share"). That partner is now an equity owner in that aircraft and can sell the equity position if necessary. This also entitles the new owner to a certain number of hours of flight time on that aircraft, or any comparable aircraft in the fleet. Additional fees include monthly management fees and incidentals such as catering and ground transportation. In the United States, fractional-ownership operations may be regulated by either FAA part 91 or part 135.

Other Operation Models 
Other operation models used by private jet hire companies include buying blocks of time in predetermined increments, pay as you fly and paying a flat rate for unlimited usage and access.

Buying blocks of time in predetermined increments involves buying blocks of time in hours. This model usually depends on how many flight hours a client will be needing. Pay as you fly resembles the business model used by commercial airlines where a client only pays for a flight they use. The downside to this model is that clients find it difficult to secure flights because most private flights are usually booked in advance.

Paying a flat rate for unlimited usage as the name implies, uses a business model where clients pay a flat rate, and then the jet is made available to them for the duration that payment lasts. This model makes it possible for a client to pay a certain amount for unlimited access and usage to a jet, or a fleet of jets for the duration. This model has been discontinued by most private jet hire companies because clients have exploited the usage in the past. This model now employs a fair usage policy.

Surveillance 

With smaller equipment, long-range business aircraft can be modified as surveillance aircraft to perform specialized missions cost-effectively, from ground surveillance to maritime patrol:
 The , 6,750 nmi Gulfstream G550 was selected for the IAI EL/W-2085 Conformal Airborne Early Warning AESA radar for Italy, Singapore and Israel (which also has IAI Sigint G550s) while L3 Technologies transfers the U.S. Compass Call electronic-attack system to the G550 CAEW-based EC-37B, like the NC-37B range-support aircraft, and will modify others for Australia's  program, Northrop Grumman proposes the G550 for the J-Stars Recap;
 Dassault Aviation developed the Falcon 900 MPA and Falcon 2000 Maritime Multirole Aircraft for France (which delayed its Avsimar requirement), South Korea and the Japan Coast Guard with a mission system developed with L3 and Thales Group;
 Embraer delivered several EMB-145s as a platform for AEW&C, MPA and multi-intelligence;

Classes
Business jets can be categorized according to their size.

Very light jets

The very light jet (VLJ) is a classification initiated by the release of the Eclipse 500, on 31 December 2006, which was originally available at around US$1.5 million, cheaper than existing business jets and comparable with turboprop aircraft. Its introduction coincided with a speculative bubble for air taxi services, exemplified by DayJet, which ceased operations in September 2008. Eclipse Aviation failed to sustain its business model and filed for bankruptcy in February 2009.

A  MTOW limit was cited by engineering company Burns & McDonnell in 2005, Popular Mechanics in 2007, or GlobalSecurity.org.

Cessna simultaneously developed the Citation Mustang, a six-place twinjet (2 crew + 4 passengers), followed by the Embraer Phenom 100 and the Honda Jet.  Some VLJs such as the Eclipse and Mustang have no or limited lavatory facilities. They have a maximum takeoff weight lighter than the FAR Part 23 12,500 pounds limit, and are approved for single-pilot operation. They typically accommodate 6–7 passengers over a  nmi average range, with a $M mean price.

Light jets

Light jets have been a staple of the business jet industry since the advent of the Learjet 23 in the early 1960s. They provide access to small airports and the speed to be an effective air travel tool. Aircraft of this class include:
 Beechcraft Premier
 Cessna CitationJet/CJ1/2/3
 Cessna Citation II/Bravo/Ultra/Encore
 Hawker 400
 Learjet 31
 Learjet 40
 Embraer Phenom 300

They typically accommodate 6–8 passengers over a  nmi average range, with a $M mean price.

Mid-size jets

These aircraft are suitable for longer-range travel such as transcontinental flights and for travel with larger passenger capacity requirements. Aircraft of this class include:
 Citation Excel/XLS(+),
 Hawker 800/750/850/900/1000,
 Learjet 45
 Learjet 60.

They typically accommodate 9 passengers over a  nmi average range, with a $M mean price.

Super mid-size jets

Super mid-size jets feature wide-body cabin space, high-altitude capability, speed, and long range. These jets combine transatlantic capability with the speed and comfort of a wide-body, high-altitude aircraft. Aircraft of this class include:
 Bombardier Challenger 300/350
 Cessna Citation Sovereign
 Cessna Citation X
 Dassault Falcon 50
 Gulfstream G200/G250
 Hawker 4000
They typically accommodate 10–11 passengers over a  nmi average range, with a $M mean price:

Large jets

 Bombardier Challenger 600
 Dassault Falcon 2000(ER)
 Dassault Falcon 900
 Embraer Legacy 600/650

They typically accommodate 13–14 passengers over a  nmi average range, with a $M mean price.

Long range jets

 Dassault Falcon 7X
 Bombardier Global Express/5000/6000
 Gulfstream IV/G350/G450
 Gulfstream V/G500/G550
 Gulfstream G650(ER)

They typically accommodate 12–19 passengers over a  nmi average range, with a $M mean price.

VIP airliners 

Business airliner can be contracted as bizliner. Airliners converted into business jets are used by sports teams or VIPs with a large entourage or press corps. Such airplanes can face operational restrictions based on runway length or local noise restrictions. They can be the most expensive type of private jet as they provide the greatest space and capabilities.

Aircraft of this class include:
 Airbus Corporate Jets
 Boeing Business Jet
 Embraer Lineage 1000

See also

 Very light jet
 Air transports of heads of state and government
 Supersonic business jet

Notes

References

Further reading 
 
 
 
 

Jet
Private transport